Casey Currie (born December 5, 1983) is an American off-road racing driver. Along with Ricky Brabec in the bike category, Currie was the first American to win at the Dakar Rally in 2020, having won the UTV category with Sean Berriman for Monster Energy Cam-Am. In 2010, he won the Pro Light championship in the Traxxas TORC Series. In 2017 he won the Baja 1000 in the Ultra 4 Class in a Trophy Jeep.

Dakar Rally results

References

External links
Profile on Dakar Rally

1983 births
Living people
American rally drivers
Off-road racing drivers
Dakar Rally drivers
Dakar Rally winning drivers